Zephyrichthys barryi is a species of viviparous brotula found in the Indian Ocean waters around western Australia. This species grows to a length of  SL. This species is the only known member of its genus. The specific name honours in the ichthyologist J. Barry Hutchins of the Western Australian Museum (WAM) for his contribution to the knowledge of Australian fishes and for allowing the describers of Z. barryi access to the museum's collections.

References

Bythitidae
Monotypic fish genera
Fish described in 2007